The Blue of Heaven is a 1932 German musical film directed by Victor Janson and starring Mártha Eggerth, Hermann Thimig, and Fritz Kampers. It was shot at the Tempelhof Studios in Berlin. The film's sets were designed by the art director Jacek Rotmil. It is set partly on the Berlin U-Bahn system.

Cast

References

Bibliography 
 
 Klaus, Ulrich J. Deutsche Tonfilme: Jahrgang 1932. Klaus-Archiv, 1988.

External links 
 

1932 films
1932 musical films
German musical films
1930s German-language films
Films directed by Victor Janson
Films set in Berlin
Films of the Weimar Republic
Rail transport films
German black-and-white films
Films scored by Paul Abraham
1930s German films
Films shot at Tempelhof Studios